Sermenevo (Sermän) is a rural locality (a selo) and the administrative centre of Sermenevsky Selsoviet, Beloretsky District, Bashkortostan, Russia. The population was 2,018 as of 2010. There are 25 streets.

Geography 
Sermenevo is located 25 km southwest of Beloretsk (the district's administrative centre) by road. Novobelskoye is the nearest rural locality.

References 

Rural localities in Beloretsky District